Myerstown (Pennsylvania Dutch: Moyerschteddel) is a borough located in Lebanon County, Pennsylvania. It is part of the Lebanon, Pennsylvania Metropolitan statistical area. The population was 3,103 at the 2020 census. It is home to over 100 businesses, including a Bayer manufacturing plant, a GAF manufacturing plant, Farmer Boy Ag, Stoneridge Towne Centre and Wengers of Myerstown.  The Evangelical Seminary is located on South College Street.

History

On December 24, 1757,  of land was deeded to Isaac Meier and wife Catherine, who built their house at the Hergelrode site on South College Street. As early as 1763 he began deeding out lots and planned to make a town which he called Tulpehocken Town, after the Tulpehocken Creek, which runs through the borough.

Meier was fatally shot by an unknown assassin on July 14, 1770, at the Henry Buch House on 40 West Main Street which was a tavern at that time.  After his death the citizens of Tulpehocken Town began to call it Meier's Town after him.

The Isaac Meier Homestead was added to the National Register of Historic Places in 1973.

Geography
Myerstown is located at 40°22'19" North, 76°18'15" West (40.372058, -76.304208).

Myerstown is completely surrounded by Jackson Township. It has a hot-summer humid continental climate (Dfa) and the local hardiness zone is 6b. Average monthly temperatures range from 29.2 °F in January to 74.1 °F in July.

Demographics

At the 2000 census, there were 3,171 people, 1,265 households, and 810 families residing in the borough. The population density was 3,559.1 people per square mile (1,375.7/km2). There were 1,339 housing units at an average density of 1,502.9 per square mile (580.9/km2).  The racial makeup of the borough was 97.48% White, 1.41% African American, 0.00% Native American, 0.44% Asian, 0.00% Pacific Islander, 0.22% from other races, and 0.45% from two or more races. 0.95% of the population were Hispanic or Latino of any race.
There were 1,265 households, 29.6% had children under the age of 18 living with them, 50.4% were married couples living together, 9.5% had a female householder with no husband present, and 35.9% were non-families. 31.5% of households were made up of individuals, and 16.1% were one person aged 65 or older. The average household size was 2.33 and the average family size was 2.91.

In the borough, the population was spread out, with 22.2% under the age of 18, 7.0% from 18 to 24, 29.6% from 25 to 44, 19.2% from 45 to 64, and 22.0% 65 or older. The median age was 38 years. For every 100 females there were 85.8 males. For every 100 females age 18 and over, there were 81.5 males.

The median household income was $36,563 and the median family income  was $45,698. Males had a median income of $31,985 versus $20,684 for females. The per capita income for the borough was $17,177. 6.6% of the population and 4.6% of families were below the poverty line. 8.4% of those under the age of 18 and 9.5% of those 65 and older were living below the poverty line.

Notable person
Kate Stoltz, model

References

External links

1910 establishments in Pennsylvania
Boroughs in Lebanon County, Pennsylvania
Boroughs in Pennsylvania
Populated places established in 1763